SuperFresh is a supermarket brand owned by Key Food Stores which operates in New York City and its New Jersey suburbs. The company currently operates twenty supermarkets.

The name previously belonged to a chain of stores run by A&P, based largely in the city and suburbs of Philadelphia and Baltimore.

History

A&P ownership (1982–2015)

A&P created the supermarket brand in 1982 and converted its Mid-Atlantic region stores to the new name. During this time, SuperFresh stores were located in the Philadelphia area, Delaware, Maryland, southern New Jersey, Washington, D.C., and northern Virginia. SuperFresh stores also operated in Baton Rouge, Louisiana, until 2003, when they were rebranded to A&P's Sav-A-Center banner. A&P also operated SuperFresh stores in its Canadian division, until rebranding those stores as Food Basics.

In 2006, A&P acquired six Clemens Family Markets, which were located in Montgomery and Bucks counties in suburban Philadelphia, converting them to the SuperFresh banner.

In 2007, A&P acquired the Pathmark supermarket chain and, in 2008, announced plans to convert eight of the 13 Philadelphia-area SuperFresh stores to its new Pathmark Sav-A-Center banner. The company planned to renovate the remaining SuperFresh stores into its successful "Fresh" format (used in its A&P Fresh Markets). The change would re-position the Superfresh brand as an upscale banner.

Following its Chapter 11 bankruptcy reorganization, A&P announced in early 2011 its intention to sell or close 32 stores across its six supermarket banners. Included in the group were eight SuperFresh stores and one former Superfresh store in Glasgow, Delaware, which had just been converted to the Pathmark Sav-A-Center brand two years prior.

The stores that closed were:

40 Souder Road Brunswick, Maryland
2892 Salisbury, Maryland
5258 Yardley, Pennsylvania
5377 Lionville, Pennsylvania
5404 East Windsor, New Jersey
5420 Hamilton Township, New Jersey
5460 Mount Holly, New Jersey
5476 Cape May Court House, New Jersey
5493 Hammonton, New Jersey
5590 Glasgow, Delaware (former Superfresh, converted to Pathmark Sav-A-Center)

On April 13, 2011, A&P announced plans to close or sell 25 additional SuperFresh stores: 22 in Maryland, 2 in Delaware (Dover and Milford), and the only store in Washington, D.C. These supermarkets closed by July 15 and were replaced by Shoppers Food & Pharmacy, ShopRite, and Fresh & Green's.

On November 14, 2012, A&P announced the closure of three New Jersey SuperFresh locations in Marlton, Westmont, and Plainsboro. These stores were liquidated in January 2013, leaving Manahawkin, Ocean City, and Wildwood as the only remaining stores in New Jersey.

On July 20, 2015, A&P announced that it was filing for bankruptcy for a second time.  The company liquidated in late 2015, selling as many stores as possible to competitors, and closing the remainder. During this process, all Superfresh stores were either closed or rebannered as Acme or ShopRite.

Key Food ownership (2016–present)

In February 2016, Key Food Stores acquired the trademark and rights to the SuperFresh brand name during the A&P bankruptcy auction. On March 11, 2016, Key Food relaunched the SuperFresh brand from their location in Paterson, New Jersey, formerly a Food Basics.

Additional stores have opened in:
Baldwin, NY (former Pathmark)
Bronx, NY
Bronx, NY
Brooklyn, NY
Brooklyn, NY
Belleville, NJ (former Pathmark)
Bloomfield, NJ (former A&P)
Clifton, NJ
Elmhurst, NY
Glen Rock, NJ (former Food Basics)
Hopelawn, NJ
Irvington, NJ (former Pathmark)
Jackson Heights, NY
Linden, NJ
Passaic, NJ
Paterson, NJ (former Food Basics)
Roselle, NJ
Staten Island, NY (former Pathmark)
Staten Island, NY
Sunnyside, NY

When SuperFresh was operated by A&P, its operational territory was the Philadelphia, Washington, D.C., and Baltimore metropolitan areas. Since the acquisition of the brand by Key Food, the focus has been in parts of New York City and its nearby New Jersey suburbs.

Slogans

Doing More for You
The great store...just next door!
We Built A Proud New Feeling (mid-to-late 1980s; also used by parent chain A&P during this time)
We're Fresh... We're Super Fresh
We're Fresh Obsessed
I Love This Store! (2002–2010)
You want lower prices, we hear you. (2010–2011)
Better Store, Better Living. (2011–Present)
The Savings Never Stop.  Every Aisle, Every Item, Every Day.  (2016–Present)

References

External links
Official website

The Great Atlantic & Pacific Tea Company
Supermarkets of the United States
Companies based in Baltimore
American companies established in 1982
Retail companies established in 1982
1982 establishments in the United States
Companies that filed for Chapter 11 bankruptcy in 2010
Companies that filed for Chapter 11 bankruptcy in 2015